Thailand competed at the 1976 Summer Olympics in Montreal, Quebec, Canada. 42 competitors, 39 men and 3 women, took part in 33 events in 11 sports.

The country won their first Olympic medal, a bronze for boxing's Payao Poontarat. It became the third Southeast Asian country to win the first Olympic medal after the Philippines (won a bronze for swimming in 1928) and Singapore (won a silver in 1960 in weightlifting). It took 20 years until Thailand won its first gold medal in Atlanta, also in the boxing.

Medalists

Archery

Women's Individual Competition:
 Am. Kaewbaidhoon — 2282 points (→ 18th place)

Men's Individual Competition:
 Vallop Potaya — 2060 points (→ 35th place)
 Vichit Suksumpong — 2032 points (→ 36th place)

Athletics

Men's 4 × 100 metres Relay
Anat Ratanapol, Suchart Jairsuraparp, Somsakdi Boontud, and Sayan Paratanavong
 Heat — 40.53s
 Semi Finals — 40.68s (→ did not advance)

Boxing

Cycling

Six cyclists represented Thailand in 1976.

Individual road race
 Panya Singprayool-Dinmuong — did not finish (→ no ranking)
 Arlee Wararong — did not finish (→ no ranking)
 Chartchai Juntrat — did not finish (→ no ranking)
 Prajin Rungrote — did not finish (→ no ranking)

Team time trial
 Sucheep Likittay
 Chartchai Juntrat
 Panya Singprayool-Dinmuong
 Prajin Rungrote

Sprint
 Taworn Tarwan — 24th place

1000m time trial
 Taworn Tarwan — 1:15.136 (→ 27th place)

Diving

Fencing

Five fencers, all men, represented Thailand in 1976.

Men's épée
 Taweewat Hurapan
 Sneh Chousurin
 Sutipong Santitevagul

Men's team épée
 Sneh Chousurin, Taweewat Hurapan, Sutipong Santitevagul, Royengyot Srivorapongpant, Samachai Trangjaroenngarm

Men's sabre
 Taweewat Hurapan
 Sutipong Santitevagul
 Royengyot Srivorapongpant

Men's team sabre
 Taweewat Hurapan, Samachai Trangjaroenngarm, Sutipong Santitevagul, Royengyot Srivorapongpant

Judo

Sailing

Shooting

Swimming

Weightlifting

References

External links
Official Olympic Reports
International Olympic Committee results database

Nations at the 1976 Summer Olympics
1976 Summer Olympics
1976 in Thai sport